Stefania Spampinato is a Sicilian actress. She is known for her role in ABC's Grey's Anatomy and the Grey's Anatomy spinoff Station 19 as Dr. Carina DeLuca, an Italian OB-GYN.

Life and career 
Born in Catania (Sicily), Stefania Spampinato began studying dance at the age of six. After graduating with full marks from the Liceo Classico Mario Cutelli in Catania, she moved to Milan to study dance, acting and singing, where she also graduated from the Academy of Arts. In 2006 she moved to London, where her work as a dancer enabled her to travel the world. In 2011, Spampinato moved to Los Angeles, where she continued to study acting.

After taking part in TV series such as Glee and Satisfaction, Spampinato joined the cast of Grey's Anatomy in 2017 as Dr. Carina DeLuca, sister of Dr. Andrew DeLuca, and from 2020 continues to play the same role in the TV series Station 19, the second spin-off from Grey's Anatomy.

In 2019, she was chosen as the co-star of the comedy The Most Beautiful Day in the World, interpreted and directed by Alessandro Siani.

Personal life 
Spampinato married choreographer Tony Testa in 2018. The divorce was finalized in 2020.

Filmography

Film

Television

References

External links

Living people
Italian film actresses
Italian stage actresses
Italian television actresses
Italian voice actresses
People from Catania
Mass media people from Sicily
21st-century Italian actresses
Year of birth missing (living people)